Cunegundes may refer to:

Cunigunde of Luxembourg ( 975–1040), also called St. Cunegundes and St. Cunegonda, wife of the Holy Roman Emperor Saint Henry II
Kinga of Poland (1234–1292), also known as Saint Cunegundes

Feminine given names